Blessed Trinity College is a Roman Catholic co-education secondary school located on the Antrim Road in north Belfast, Northern Ireland.

History
The college was formed in 2017 with the coming together of the Little Flower School and St Patrick's College, Belfast.  Both of these schools had a long history of providing secondary education in north Belfast with St. Patrick's having been established in 1955.

Academics
The school provides instruction in a range of academic subjects.  At GCSE A-level it offers instruction in Art & Design, Business Studies, Drama, Engineering, English Literature, French, Geography, History, Health & Social Care, ICT, Irish, Mathematics, Moving Image Arts, Music, Religious Studies, Science, Sports Studies and Travel & Tourism. In 2021, 91 per cent of pupils achieved five or more GCSE grades.

Sports and Extra-curricular activities
There is a wide range of sporting and other activities.  Sports include athletics, swimming, tennis, football and netball.

Awards
In 2021, the college was awarded the Spirit of Catholic Education Award 2021, with High Commendation by the Down and Connor Diocese Catholic Schools’ Support Service.

Notable alumni
 Ryan Burnett - boxer (attended St. Patrick's)

See also
 List of secondary schools in Belfast
 List of secondary schools in Northern Ireland

References  

Secondary schools in Belfast
Catholic secondary schools in Northern Ireland
2017 establishments in Northern Ireland
Educational institutions established in 2017